Cobweb painting, sometimes known as gossamer painting, is the delicate process of painting on canvases made from caterpillar and spider webs that have been collected, layered, cleaned, and framed. Fewer than 100 cobweb paintings are known to exist, many of which are housed in private collections.

Introduction
Cobwebs are formed by spiders from protein and extruded from spinnerets to form fine nets. The stickiness of spiders' webs that allows them to adhere to form a 'canvas' is due to droplets of glue suspended on the gossamer threads.

History
Web painting (Spinnwebenbilder) is first documented in the 16th century from the Puster Valley in the Austrian Tyrolean Alps, carried out by monks who produced paintings on canvases made entirely of spiders' webs or caterpillar silk. These religious miniatures were usually painted for convents, other religious institutions, the middle classes, and the minor aristocracy. Only around 100 are known to exist, primarily held in private collections.  

Elias Prunner from the Puster Valley was the first secular artist to practice cobweb painting, and in 1765 he painted the Empress Maria Theresa. The celebrated beauty Philippine Welser (1527–1580) married Archduke Ferdinand II of Tyrol secretly, and she settled near Innsbruck, living in the Schloss Ambras. Small paintings of Philippine in oval shaped frames were sold to tourists by Franz Unterberger (1838–1902) of Innsbruck, an artist who employed other local artists to produce the portraits. These cobweb paintings were exported to England, North America and Germany in significant numbers.

In the 19th and early 20th century the cobweb artists of Innsbruck painted landscapes and scenes involving local peasants, as well as military engagements of the wars of independence. The industrial revolution gave many new themes for cobweb artists to paint. From 1920 onwards no new cobweb paintings from the Tyrol have been recorded.

Cobweb painting is still occasionally attempted.

The cobweb canvas

The cobwebs obtained for the early Austrian example came from Agelenidae funnel-web spiders, whose gossamer sheets were collected in the form of a thin canvas, then put under tension to make an oval blank. The canvas can be strengthened by brushing diluted milk onto the web with great care. Considerable attention must be taken to clean the web, removing insect parts, spider droppings, etc. It is noted that people were employed specifically to collect the large amount of cobwebs required for the many canvases.

Other webs canvases
Chester Cathedral possesses a cobweb image of the Virgin Mary, painted on the net of the moth caterpillar Yponomeuta evonymella, probably made by Johan Burgman (d. 1825) from the Tyrol, Austria. It is a copy of a painting by Lucas Cranach I (1472–1553) in Innsbruck Cathedral (Dom zu St. Jakob), Tyrol.

The painting process
Oil paints can also be employed, and stippling is a technique that can be used to reduce the chance of damage to the canvas, however this can be very time-consuming. Chinese ink was also sometimes used.

Further reading
K. Toldt, Über die Tiroler Spinnweben- bzw. Raupengespinst-Bilder, Veröffentlichung des Museum Ferdinandeum 26/29, Innsbruck 1949, p. 167-206

See also
 Cobweb art
 Painting
 Drawing
 Landscape painting
 Outline of painting
 Visual arts

References

Spiders and humans
Painting techniques